Gregg Murphy is a sports journalist and reporter. He served as a field reporter for NBC Sports Philadelphia's coverage of the Philadelphia Phillies from 2012 to 2020 and was part of CN8's sports coverage.

Career
Murphy spent two years as co-host and reporter for The Inquirer High School Sports Show alongside Joe Briscella. Prior to coming to Philadelphia, Murphy was the weekend sports anchor and reporter for WFMZ-TV in Allentown, Pennsylvania. Murphy also produced and hosted A Piece of the Game, a weekly sports memorabilia show that aired on Sports Channel.

Murphy then worked at CN8 where he hosted Out of Bounds, an hour-long sports program, airing at 7 p.m. weeknights, that examines the nation's biggest sports stories. He explored issues impacting sports fans in CN8's viewing area from Maine to Virginia, and marshals the Out of Bounds experts chiming in from Boston, Washington, D.C., New York City and Philadelphia to create lively discussion and energetic debate. Also, he contributed to CN8's sports productions year-round, as host or reporter for the network's live event coverage and specials.  He also served as the lead sports anchor for the 7 p.m. and 10 p.m. broadcasts of CN8 News each weeknight. Before joining CN8. Murphy appeared for the first time on NBC Sports Philadelphia on December 28, 2008, and hosted his first edition of Daily News Live on December 30.

Beginning with the 2012 season, Murphy served as a member of the Philadelphia Phillies' broadcast team, providing reports from various locations throughout the stadium as the game goes along. He also did occasional play-by-play. In August 2020, NBC Sports Philadelphia announced that Murphy would not be returning as a field reporter for the Phillies after the 2020 season.

Murphy started a podcast in April 2021 called Glove Stories with Murph presented by SBC Media Partners. The podcast focuses on stories from Phillies greats and includes memories of the 2008 World Series season with Charlie Manuel and the 1980 World Series season with Larry Bowa. Episode one included interviews with Hall of Famer Mike Schmidt, former manager Charlie Manuel and a preview of the 2021 season with The Philadelphia Inquirer's Matt Breen. He also began doing pre and post-game for Friday, Saturday, and Sunday Phillies games on the radio.

Personal life
Murphy was raised in Mount Laurel, New Jersey and attended Holy Cross Academy. He received a Bachelor of Science degree from Saint Joseph's University. He currently resides in the Mullica Hill section of Harrison Township, New Jersey with his wife and three children.

References

External links

Living people
Major League Baseball broadcasters
American sports announcers
Holy Cross Academy (New Jersey) alumni
Philadelphia Phillies announcers
Saint Joseph's University alumni
Television personalities from Philadelphia
Year of birth missing (living people)
Place of birth missing (living people)
People from Harrison Township, New Jersey
People from Mount Laurel, New Jersey